Artie Shead is a New Zealand former professional rugby league footballer who played in the 1990s, 2000s and 2010s.

He was named in the France national rugby league team on the 2001 tour of New Zealand and Papua New Guinea and for the 2009 Four Nations after qualifying through residency, being born in New Zealand and spending over three years in France.

Shead was a Northcote Tigers junior and represented Harbour League in 2006.

He represented Taranaki and New Zealand Māori in 1998.

He is the younger brother of Phillip Shead.

References

External links
 Equipe ELITE 2009/2010- LER XIII
 Equipe ELITE - LER XIII
 Equipe ELITE 2008/2009- LER XIII
 Equipe ELITE 2009/2010- LER XIII

1978 births
Living people
Baroudeurs de Pia XIII players
France national rugby league team players
French people of New Zealand descent
Limoux Grizzlies players
New Zealand Māori rugby league players
New Zealand Māori rugby league team players
New Zealand rugby league players
North Harbour rugby league team players
Northcote Tigers players
Rugby league centres
Rugby league props
Rugby league second-rows
Taranaki rugby league team players
Villeneuve Leopards players